Ami'oz is a moshav in southern Israel. Located in the Hevel Eshkol area of the north-western Negev desert near the border with the Gaza Strip, it falls under the jurisdiction of Eshkol Regional Council.

History
The moshav was first established in 1956 by Jewish immigrants and refugees from Egypt and Romania. Its name recognises the strength (Oz) displayed by IDF soldiers during the Suez Crisis.

However, it was not a success, and all but four families left. In the early 1960s some Vizhnitz Jews arrived to attempt to settle the area, though they also failed. The community was permanently established in 1962 by a group of immigrants from Morocco who settled on the site with the aid of the Jewish Agency.

References

External links
Amioz at Negev information center 

Moshavim
Populated places established in 1956
Gaza envelope
Populated places in Southern District (Israel)
1956 establishments in Israel
Egyptian-Jewish culture in Israel
Romanian-Jewish culture in Israel